The Life of Riley is the fourth album by Australian hip hop artist, Drapht. The songs were recorded in Drapht's home studio and was released in April 2011 on Drapht's own label The Ayems. The album debuted at number 1 on the ARIA Albums Chart. The album features contributions from Briggs, N'fa, Funkoars and Urthboy. Drapht believes that this album was the toughest project in his career.

At the J Awards of 2011, the album was nominated for Australian Album of the Year.

Track listing

Charts

Weekly charts

Year-end charts

Certifications

References

Drapht albums
2011 albums
ARIA Award-winning albums